Rowlands Castle railway station serves the village of Rowland's Castle, Hampshire, England. It is located on the Portsmouth Direct Line,  down the line from  via Woking.

History
The main station building, dating to 1859, was designed by William Tite and is Grade II listed. 

The station was once one of three between Petersfield and Havant, but is the only one to have enjoyed a regular service.  , to the south, was a temporary station built during an inter-company dispute - the Battle of Havant; Woodcroft Halt, to the north, was open for a few years round World War 2, mainly for service personnel.

Formerly there were goods and coal sidings trailing off the Up Line at the Petersfield end of the station. There was only one crossover between the two running lines, which meant that goods trains that arrived from the Petersfield direction (usually on the 0450 Goods Woking to Rowland's Castle) had to "set-back" into the headshunt and "fly shunt" (i.e. run off) wagons into the sidings rather than propelling them. This was a skilled movement and not normally permitted by the Rule Book. There was also a siding trailing off the up line, Havant side of the station, serving a brickworks adjacent to the remains of the Castle.

Services 
The station has two tracks, and two platforms, and the standard service is hourly to both Portsmouth and Waterloo. All services are operated by South Western Railway using  and  EMUs.

The typical off-peak service in trains per hour is:
 1 tph to  via 
 1 tph to 

The station is staffed from 6:30 - 9:30 in the morning. At all other times, people are served by ticket machines.

Gallery

References

External links 

Railway stations in Hampshire
DfT Category E stations
Former London and South Western Railway stations
Railway stations in Great Britain opened in 1859
Railway stations served by South Western Railway
Grade II listed buildings in Hampshire